Ben Byer (January 8, 1971 – July 3, 2008) was an American stage actor and playwright. His experiences after being diagnosed with Amyotrophic lateral sclerosis (ALS) are documented in the 2007 film Indestructible.

Biography

Early life and education
Benjamin Saul Byer was born January 8, 1971, to Barbara and Stephen Byer. One of five children, he graduated from Evanston Township High School. He studied journalism at Indiana University and film theory at the University of Paris.

Career
Byer began his career as a translator at the Cannes Film Festival, which led him to theatre and movie industry jobs in Los Angeles. He also worked in theatre in Chicago as a playwright and actor. He directed his first play, Take it Deep, in 2000.

After being diagnosed with Amyotrophic lateral sclerosis in 2002, he began documenting his life on camera. He spent the next three years keeping a video diary as he sought treatments in six countries, including having fetal cells injected directly into his brain in 2004. Although Byer did show improvements in his speech in the days following the procedure, the improvements did not last. Within the first month following the procedure, his previous ALS symptoms had returned. His footage was incorporated into film shot by Roko Belic to form the 2007 documentary film Indestructible film.

Marriage and children
Byer and his wife, Josephine Christopher, adopted a son, John Anthony Byer, shortly before his diagnosis with ALS.

Death and afterward
Byer died of ALS complications on July 3, 2008, in Cleveland, Ohio. He was interred at Shalom Memorial Park in Arlington Heights, Illinois.

Awards
Ben Byer won the award of Best Documentary Film at the 2008 Byron Bay International Film Festival for the movie Indestructible. Top Ten documentaries of all time.

Published works
Take It Deep (play, 2000)
Versailles (play, 2003)

References

External links

Interview with Lifted magazine

1971 births
2008 deaths
20th-century American dramatists and playwrights
American male stage actors
Neurological disease deaths in Ohio
Deaths from motor neuron disease
Male actors from Evanston, Illinois
Writers from Evanston, Illinois